A framework is a generic term commonly referring to an essential supporting structure which other things are built on top of.

Framework may refer to:

Computing
 Application framework, used to implement the structure of an application for an operating system
 Architecture framework
 Content management framework, reusable components of a content management system
 CSS framework
 Enterprise architecture framework
 Framework (office suite), a DOS office application suite in 1984
 Framework Computer, a laptop manufacturer for modular laptops
 Framework-oriented design, uses existing frameworks for application design
 List of rich web application frameworks
 Logical framework
 Multimedia framework, handles media on a computer and through a network
 Software framework, a reusable set of libraries or classes for a software system or subsystem
 Web framework, for development of dynamic websites, web applications, and web services

Education
Australian Qualifications Framework, the hierarchy of educational qualifications in Australia
Curriculum framework, a plan, standards or learning outcomes that define content to be learned
European Qualifications Framework, a hierarchy of educational qualifications in the European Union
Malaysian Qualifications Framework, the hierarchy of educational qualifications in Malaysia
National Framework of Qualifications, the hierarchy of educational qualifications in Ireland
Schools Interoperability Framework, a data sharing specification for academic institutions

Government and law
Framework agreement
Framework decision, a legislative act of the European Union
Legal framework, a form of legal doctrine
Local development framework, a spatial planning strategy
Logical framework approach, a management tool used in international development projects
National Service Framework, policies by the National Health Service of the United Kingdom

Music
The Framework, Canadian indie-rock band
Frameworks (band), American post-hardcore band
Frameworks, 2015 album by Samuel Seo
 "Framework", 2013 song by The Story So Far from What You Don't See

Other uses
 Conceptual framework, a set of theories that serve as the guiding principles of research
 Cultural framework, traditions, value systems, myths, and symbols that are common in a society
 Framework (building), a proposed building in Portland, Oregon
 Framework interpretation (Genesis), an interpretation of the first chapter of Genesis
 Framework region, a region in the variable domain of a protein
 Media engagement framework, a construct to understand social media marketing-based audiences
 Framework Computer, a company to provide a sustainable and repairable laptop

See also
Frame (disambiguation)
Framing (disambiguation)
Framework convention (disambiguation)
Framework Directive (disambiguation)